Benjamin Maruquin (born February 26, 1970 in Ventura, California) is a former field hockey sweeper from the United States, who finished twelfth with the national team at the 1996 Summer Olympics in Atlanta, Georgia.

He was taught field hockey by his father Marvin Maruquin and his uncle Beau Stockdill (both of whom competed at the Pan American Games in the 1970s).

He was named as the USA Field Hockey male Athlete of the Year in 1991 and 1993. He competed in over 200 international matches for the USA Men's National Team from 1989-1997.

He moved into coaching after his competitive retirement. He became the head coach at the Ventura County High Performance Training Center in 2006 and was chosen as the USA Men's U-21 Head Coach in 2010.

References

External links
 

1970 births
Living people
American male field hockey players
Olympic field hockey players of the United States
Field hockey players at the 1996 Summer Olympics
People from Greater Los Angeles
Pan American Games bronze medalists for the United States
Pan American Games medalists in field hockey
Field hockey players at the 1995 Pan American Games
Medalists at the 1995 Pan American Games